Momentos means moments in Spanish and Portuguese.

Momentos may also refer to:
 Momentos (Al Bano and Romina Power album), a 1979 album by Al Bano & Romina Power
 Momentos (Julio Iglesias album)
 Momentos (La Mafia album)
 Momentos (Luiza Possi album), a 2015 compilation album by Luiza Possi 
 Momentos (film), a 1981 Argentinian film

See also 
 Los Momentos, a 2013 album by Julieta Venegas
 Moment (disambiguation)